Lynette Farkash (née Brake) is a former New Zealand gymnast. She won a bronze medal representing her country—alongside Kirsty Durward, Rowena Davis and Deborah Hurst—in the women's all-around team event at the 1978 Commonwealth Games. Also at those games, she finished 17th in the women's individual all-round.

, Farkash is the manager and head women's artistic gymnastics coach at Mid-Island Gym Sports in Rotorua.

References

Year of birth missing (living people)
Living people
Sportspeople from Rotorua
New Zealand female artistic gymnasts
Commonwealth Games bronze medallists for New Zealand
Gymnasts at the 1978 Commonwealth Games
Commonwealth Games medallists in gymnastics
New Zealand sports coaches
20th-century New Zealand women
Medallists at the 1978 Commonwealth Games